In the United States, a student pilot certificate is issued to a pilot in training, and is a prerequisite for the student to fly alone in the aircraft, or solo.  

A medical certificate is required, which is issued directly by the AME. Prior to April 1, 2016, it could be issued by a medical doctor who is also an authorized aviation medical examiner (AME), in conjunction with the student's first medical certificate. Although the classification of the medical does not matter, it is suggested that the student get a first-class medical to know if they can pass the more difficult tests. 

The student takes the certificate to their instructor, who then completes an application. All applications are completed online through the Integrated Airman Certification and Rating Application (ACCRA) on the Federal Aviation Administration's online portal. The student pilot is to fill out the form and have their instructor check all forms before submission. The student must fill it out, then the instructor does a portion, and the cycle repeats. The completed application is sent to the FAA, which will send the student pilot certificate to the student. A temporary certificate is available after the form has been approved, usually approximately two weeks after submission. This temporary paper can be used during the actual solo flight until the physical card arrives in the mail. Although this student pilot certificate does not always come right before a solo flight, it is required, and thus earning a student pilot certificate is a sign that a solo flight may be near.

Steps 
Obtaining a student pilot certificate authorizing solo flight requires four steps:
 Be 16 years of age or older (14 years for gliders and balloons)
 Pass a flight physical administered by an aviation medical examiner (for powered aircraft only, excluding gliders and balloons) (1st, 2nd, or 3rd class acceptable)
 Receive ground and flight instruction (this is often around 20–25 hours of actual flight instruction before a solo and thus the cost can be expensive)
 Earn an endorsement from a certificated flight instructor
 Some flight schools require students to have personal insurance before they use their student license and fly their first solo flight. There are many different ways to go about getting insurance, and the amount of coverage, as well as the cost, can vary. Instructors generally have information of this.

Although there are minimum ages for licenses, there is no minimum age for when flight training can occur. In the aviation industry all time should be logged; therefore if a prospective student goes flying at 12 years old with proper educational guidance, the prospective student should log the time.  

Private pilot licenses require a minimum of 40 hours. Commercial licenses require a minimum of 250 hours. In order to be considered for an airline position, most airlines require at least 1500 hours of total flight time.

Student pilot certificates allow students to fly the plane by themselves, with instructor sign-off. The time logged flying under the student pilot certificate is PIC (or pilot in command time), meaning all responsibilities are on the student pilot.

There are limitations to this student pilot certificate. Students still can only fly under visual flight rules (VFR). Additionally, they are still under the instruction of their instructor. This means students are unable to rent a plane and pilot it as they wish. Lastly, they may not fly for compensation or hire as a student pilot.

See also
 Pilot certification in the United States – Student pilot

References

https://www.faa.gov/pilots/become/student_cert
https://www.gtc.edu/sites/default/files/files/documents/1550001446/Medical%20and%20Student%20Pilot%20Cert%20Help.pdf
Aviation licenses and certifications